Chaverim (literally, "companions"), also spelled Chaveirim, is an umbrella name for Orthodox Jewish volunteer organizations with locations all over the world, they provide roadside assistance and other non-medical emergency help at home or on the road. All services are free. The organizations are supported by local donations.

History 
Chaverim was started in Monsey, New York by Rabbi Shaya Zev Erps in July 1999. The grassroots organization opened a hotline to assist stranded motorists and elderly and handicapped individuals. Since its founding, the Boro Park Chaverim has logged over 100,000 calls, with hundreds of calls received daily.

Activities 
Chaverim volunteers respond to calls at any hour and perform the following duties, including, but not limited to:
Assist people locked out of their home or vehicle
Repair flat tires and pump low tires
Boost car batteries
Assist cars stuck in snow, mud, etc.
Give rides to motorists whose cars are disabled
Transport families to weddings during snowstorms
Give directions for those in unfamiliar areas
Obtain gas if someone's gas tank runs dry
Assist with burst pipes
Assist with loss of essential services such as gas, electric, water, or telephone
Provide members for a shiva minyan

Car inspections 
Chaverim of Boro Park provides free 10-minute safety inspections of vehicles prior to the August summer vacation period to draw drivers' attention to safety issues with their cars. Free inspections of tire pressure, blinkers, fluids, spare tire, and other car needs are also offered before the summer vacation by the Lakewood Chaverim.

Holiday assistance 
In 2010 Chaverim of Queens initiated a "Don't Drink and Drive Campaign" on Purim which provided drivers to take home inebriated residents.

Awards 
In July 2008 the Lakewood Chaveirim were the recipients of a state resolution presented by New Jersey Senator Robert Singer. In July 2011 the same group was given a special award for community service by the Lakewood Police Department. Police Chief Rob Lawson cited the group's help during a blackout when members volunteered to direct traffic at intersections, as well as their assistance to people locked out of their cars or homes.

Collaborative efforts 
Chaverim volunteers often work together with those of the Shomrim, Shmira and Hatzalah organizations to assist residents during crippling weather events, and missing persons searches.

In 2011, Brooklyn City Councilman David Greenfield announced a partnership with Boro Park Chaverim to identify potholes in Flatbush and Midwood after severe winter weather in 2010.
 
Many Chaverim volunteers are professional tradesmen who donate their professional skills to provide emergency assistance.

Locations 
Chaverim organizations are located in:

United States

New York 
 Brooklyn (including Borough Park, Sea Gate, Williamsburg, Crown Heights and Flatbush)
 Manhattan (including Washington Heights)
 The Catskills
 Staten Island 
 Five Towns
 Queens (including Far Rockaway, which is separate)
 Rockland County (including Monsey)
 Kiryas Joel

New Jersey 
 Jersey Shore
 Lakewood
 Passaic
 Bergen County
 Toms River
 Cherry Hill
 Union County

Other 

 North East Pennsylvania (NEPA)
 Boston
 Baltimore
Chicago
Houston
Waterbury
West Hartford
 Cleveland
 Detroit
 Iowa (primarily in Postville, IA)
 Los Angeles
 Phoenix & Scottsdale, Arizona
 Philadelphia
 South Florida
 Greater Washington DC (primarily in Silver Spring)

Australia 
 Melbourne

Belgium 
 Antwerp

Canada 
 Montreal
 Toronto

United Kingdom 
 London (Stamford Hill, NW London)
 Manchester

Similar organizations 
Yedidim, an independent offshoot of New York's Chaverim, operates in Israel since 2006 with 18,000 volunteers. This volunteer group responds to calls to jumpstart cars, change flat tires, fix home plumbing and electrical problems, and any other non-medical request. The founder of the organization is Meir Wiener. The organization is headed by Israel Almasi and Lazzy Stern.

See also
 Motor club

References

External links 
 Chaveirim Demonstration Removing and Plugging Tire (video)
 Lakewood Police Department Awards Ceremony and Promotions Chaveirim Award (video)
 "Lakewood Gym Sponsors Evening Of Relaxation For Chaveirim Members"
 Chaverim Stories

1999 establishments in New York (state)
Organizations established in 1999
Volunteer organizations in the United States
Jewish community organizations
Orthodox Jews and Judaism in New York City
Jews and Judaism in Brooklyn
Jews and Judaism in Baltimore
Non-profit organizations based in the United States